Ebrahim Patel (born 1962 in District Six in Cape Town) is a South African cabinet minister, who holds the position of Minister of Trade, Industry and Competition. He previously served as  Minister of Economic Development from 2009 to 2019.

Background

Patel was born in Cape Town in 1962 into a working-class family, with his mother, a garment worker, being the sole bread winner.

He grew up in Lansdowne and Grassy Park.

He has three children, Amilcar, Iqraa and Zamir.

Education

He completed high school in 1979 and was one of the top 10 matriculants nationally, which afforded him bursaries and scholarships that led him to complete a university degree.

He started his tertiary education at the University of the Western Cape in 1980, but due to delays from being politically active, he ended up completing his BA (Bachelor of Arts) degree through the University of Cape Town a few years later.

Early political and labour activism

Patel became involved in worker and student struggles while at high school and led the student boycott of Fatti's and Monis products during a worker strike at the pasta factory in March 1979

During his first year at the University of the Western Cape in 1980, he was a leader in a nationwide student uprising that started in Cape Town. He was detained under Section 10 of the Internal Security Act and was kept for a number of months at Victor Verster prison in Paarl. He was released without being charged.

During this period, he was actively involved in anti-apartheid activities, from campaigns against the celebration of the old republic, to campaigns against the Coloured Representative Council and the tricameral parliament. He became involved in struggles over access to housing and electricity. He established community organisations in the Lotus River-Grassy Park-Parkwood area. He worked closely with activists from different areas including Trevor Manuel, who represented communities in Kensington-Factreton area, in the Cape Areas Housing Action Committee (CAHAC).

A year later, he was detained under Section 6 of the Terrorism Act and kept in detention initially at Caledon Square police station in Cape Town. After a number of months in detention, he was again released without being charged.

He was involved in building support for workers on strike at Leyland Motors, as well as at Wilson-Rowntree, an Eastern Cape confectionery factory.

In 1982 he was detained on a third occasion and taken to Protea Police Station in Soweto.

He left university to work full-time at SALDRU, the research division of the School of Economics at the University of Cape Town in the first half of 1982 and completed his degree part-time at UCT shortly thereafter.

He was part of the inaugural meetings of the Cape Democratic Front and later the United Democratic Front, where he served on the resolutions committee and represented the Lotus River/Grassy Park area.

While working at the University of Cape Town, he unionised fellow workers from 1983 and was elected a shop steward at the university and led the negotiations on wages and working conditions. Later he was elected General Secretary of the union and became involved with the union movement in Cape Town and took part in the debates and meetings that led to the formation of Cosatu in December 1985.

He also helped organise the nationwide anti-apartheid general strikes/stayaways that rocked the country during the 1980s and 1990s.

Involvement with South African clothing and textile unions

Patel joined the textile union, the National Union of Textile Workers (NUTW) as a full-time organiser in 1986, having worked on a voluntary basis with the auto, food and textile unions during his period at the School of Economics.

He was part of the amalgamation of the NUTW with other unions to eventually become the Southern African Clothing and Textile Workers Union, formed in 1989 in Cape Town. He served in a number of positions in the union, and was elected deputy general secretary in the early 1990s, and became General Secretary in 1999 - a position which he held until 2009.

He has concluded hundreds of recognition, wage and other collective agreements over the period of more than two decades. His work in the clothing, textile and footwear industry resulted in the formation of a national bargaining council in the clothing sector and later in the textile sector. He worked to improve productivity and competitiveness at a number of enterprises while retaining and expanding the rights of workers. These included work with Levi's Strauss and the largest clothing company, the Seardel Group which employs 14 000 workers. He has served on the Board of Zenzeleni Clothing, a clothing company set up by the trade union in 1988 to help employ retrenched workers and which is still in operation, employing about 120 workers. He played a key role in 2008 in saving the Seardel Group from bankruptcy through raising a R250 million capital-injection and a change in the ownership and control of the company.

He worked with his predecessor, Johnny Copelyn, in setting up a union-investment company that has grown to be the largest union-controlled one in South Africa. It is now a multi-billion company whose proceeds help to fund bursaries for children of union members and a range of social programmes. The union now issues bursaries to more than 700 students (the children of members of the union) a year and spends more than R3m in grants to students at tertiary institutions. During his period as head of the union, the organisation also set up the largest union-controlled HIV programme in the world, which provides education to members, training to workplace representatives, voluntary counselling and testing to about 10 000 workers a year and support for home-based carers.

Labour activism from the 1990s onwards

Patel was a member of the first trade union delegation that met Nelson Mandela at his home in Soweto after his release from prison in 1990.

During his period in the labour movement, he led organised labour in key policy and legislative negotiations. He also led negotiations on matters like access for low-income citizens to banking, supply of water to rural areas, HIV codes at the workplace and national positions on trade policy.

He was the lead negotiator in 1993 in the National Economic Forum that put together an interim plan on jobs and combating customs fraud as well as promoting a new framework for small enterprise development.

He was appointed to lead the three labour federations (Cosatu, Nactu and Fedusa) as Overall Labour Convenor in Nedlac at its formation. In this position, he worked closely with Kgalema Motlanthe, then General Secretary of the NUM, as well as Mbhazima Shilowa, then General Secretary of Cosatu, as part of the labour team at Nedlac.

He led the negotiations for organised labour that resulted in the Labour Relations Act and the Basic Conditions of Employment Act.

He was also the lead negotiator for organised labour at the 1998 Presidential Jobs Summit convened by President Mandela and at the Growth and Development Summit convened by President Mbeki in 2004, both of which resulted in key policy documents being agreed.

He has served on the central executive committee of Cosatu for almost two decades and has represented Cosatu widely in negotiations and policy discussions.

During the late 1980s, he led the Cosatu campaign on a Workers' Charter that laid the basis for the workers' rights clauses in the South African Bill of Rights in our constitution. He was also part of the Cosatu team that negotiated the language of the labour rights clauses in the constitution with the ANC during the Constitutional Assembly discussions that led to the adoption of the country's new constitution.

He was part of the drafting team in 1993 that put together the Reconstruction and Development Programme (RDP) that was the ANC's election manifesto during the historic 1994 elections that led to the establishment of democracy. In 2009 he was again part of the team that finalised the 2009 ANC Manifesto and contributed with his colleagues in the formulation (among others) of the decent work conception of the Manifesto.

His most recent tripartite negotiations were the conclusion of the Framework for South Africa's Response to the International Economic Crisis, adopted by Nedlac in February 2009.

He has travelled extensively to promote decent work across the world and has spoken at several major business and union conferences.

Involvement at the ILO

He has served on the Governing Body of the UN tripartite body, the International Labour Organization (ILO), most recently as the vice-chairperson of the Workers Group. He was global spokesperson for organised labour on employment and social policy and used to be spokesperson on multinational enterprises.

He led the negotiations at the ILO on a number of key policy and legal instruments. For example, he led negotiations for - and co-drafted - the ILO's Global Employment Agenda, which contributed to international efforts to promote decent work, to tackle unemployment and the employment growth challenge.

He also co-drafted the groundbreaking Declaration on Social Justice for a Fair Globalisation, a key ILO document adopted unanimously by 180 governments and the global representatives of employers and workers. The document sets out the mandate of the ILO in the context of globalisation and identifies the components of decent work, a concept that now has universal resonance. It sets out a vision for a modern effective ILO and lists the key steps governments can take to promote decent work.

Furthermore, he made the proposal that led eventually to the Global Wage Report, a flagship publication of the ILO. He also led the labour team in the negotiation and drafting of two key ILO international labour standards: the Recommendation on the Employment Relationship and the Recommendation on Co-operatives. He was the chief spokesperson for labour in the ILO in the discussion that led to the Conclusions on the Scope of the Employment Relationship and the Conclusions on Human Resource Development.

Other international labour advocacy activities

He was part of the South African delegation at several ministerial meetings of the World Trade Organization (WTO), including at Singapore, Seattle – which he attended together with Zwelinzima Vavi, head of Cosatu – and Geneva.

In 2009, he led the labour engagement with government leaders as part of the preparations for the G20 Summit, when a small global labour team met with Presidents Motlanthe (South Africa) and Lula (Brazil), Prime Ministers Gordon Brown (UK) and Kevin Rudd (Australia) and the heads of the International Monetary Fund (Dominique Strauss Kahn) and WTO (Pascal Lamy). Following its deliberations, the summit agreed to a combination of economic stimuli measures and greater regulation of financial markets.

Minister of Economic Development (2009 - 2019)
Ebrahim Patel was appointed to the Cabinet as Minister of Economic Development in 2009 and was reappointed in 2014.

His responsibilities include competition and trade policy, industrial funding (of the Industrial Development Corporation (IDC), Africa's largest development finance institution) and infrastructure monitoring and coordination.

Agencies reporting to his Department are: the Competition Commission of South Africa, the Competition Tribunal, the International Trade Administration Commission (ITAC) and IDC. During his time as Minister of Economic Development, he headed the Secretariat of the Presidential Infrastructure Coordinating Commission.

As Minister of Economic Development, he led the transformation of competition policy in South Africa, with a greater focus by the competition authorities on action against cartels and abuse of dominance. These included action against cartels in the food, construction and auto-component sectors. He introduced a new focus on public interest conditions in mergers and acquisitions, with significant commitments made by companies like Walmart, Coca-Cola, AB InBev and Glencore to retain employment in South Africa, support local industries and small business development, increase investment in production facilities and include South Africans in the equity holdings of their companies.

Walmart was required by the Competition Appeal Court to establish a R200m Fund to support local small businesses; Coca-Cola agreed with the Department to establish an R800 million Fund for local entrepreneurship; and AB InBev agreed to a R1 billion fund to promote small-scale farmers. Glencore set up a R220 million fund for small business as part of a settlement with the Department.

The Depaertment secured commitments from insurance giant Old Mutual, as part of its return to South Africa, that it would invest R500 million in a fund to support small business.

As part of his oversight of international trade, he focused efforts on driving greater international competitiveness of vulnerable companies through reciprocal commitments by companies who receive trade protection that they will increase investment and innovation. He introduced a trade directive on scrap metal exporters to offer scrap metal to local foundries and steel mini-mills at concessional pricing as part of an effort to support industrialization, lower carbon emission targets in the economy and infrastructure development. His decision was taken on judicial review by two sets of litigants and his Ministry's decision was upheld by the Gauteng North High Court, Western Cape High Court and Supreme Court of Appeal. An attempt by one of the exporters to have the decision reviewed by the Constitutional Court was dismissed. He subsequently extended the policy for a further period.

During the past 10 years, he directed the IDC, to increase the levels of support for industrialization, including opportunities for youth entrepreneurs, entry of women into the economy, green energy, technology innovations and black industrialists. The IDC increased the size of the loan book from R8.8 billion in March 2008 to R30.7 billion in March 2018, helping to grow South African industrial output in sectors such as mining, metals, textiles, food and beverages, chemicals, auto-production and steel making, as well as the beneficiation of local raw materials and the level of renewable energy used in the national grid.

As part of efforts to strengthen governance and avoid the impact of improper corporate influence or state capture over public entities, he directed the IDC to review its dealings with Oakbay Resources, a company the IDC had funded and which was majority-owned by the Gupta family, which led to litigation by the IDC against the company. In March 2016, he requested the IDC to review its dealings with Oakbay. In October 2016, he requested the IDC Board to review its policy on public disclosure of clients and asked that the information on all clients supported by the IDC, including politically exposed persons, be made publicly available, a decision that was implemented during the first half of 2017. In July 2017 he directed the IDC to replace its auditors KPMG, a company that had become embroiled in the state capture saga. In 2017 he requested the IDC to appoint respected Advocate Geoff Budlender to review the IDC relationship with Oakbay. The IDC became the first public entity thereafter to litigate against a company owned by the Gupta family, a group of brothers who became synonymous with state capture and corruption in South Africa.  

During the period when there were battles in the ruling party over issues of state capture, he was seen to be associated with then-Deputy President Cyril Ramaphosa, and with trade union federation COSATU and a group of progressive academics and business persons. In 2016, he called on workers at the National Congress of the Southern African Clothing and Textile Workers' Union (SACTWU) to fight corruption and state capture, the first such call made by a Cabinet Minister at a trade union Conference. In September 2017, he publicly released the results of a modeling study on the cost of corruption and state capture in the infrastructure space, stating it could cost the economy R27 billion annually and result in at least 76 000 jobs foregone in the economy.  This was the first official estimate that was made during the period when Jacob Zuma was still President of South Africa.

He chaired the Inter-Ministerial Committee set up by President Cyril Ramaphosa for the Investment Conference held in October 2018. The Conference was the turning point of a new social compact between government and investors, leading to pledges of R300 billion by a group of South African and international investors. Subsequently, South African Reserve Bank data showed that foreign direct investment during 2018 grew substantially, with R71 billion net FDI flows into South Africa, the highest in five years.

He led discussions with organized business and the trade union movement that led to a number of social Accords on: Skills Development (2011), Youth Employment (2013), the Green Economy (2011) and on Local Procurement (2011).

The Department of Trade, Industry and Competition coordinated the work on a new economic strategy for South Africa, the ‘New Growth Path’, adopted by Cabinet in October 2010, which identified the centrality of employment as a development strategy, and set out a number of ‘jobs drivers’ in the economy. Since the adoption of the New Growth Path to December 2018, 2,9 million net new jobs have been created in South Africa, bringing total employment in the economy to 16,5 million.

Among other areas of work, the Department helped to secure a decision by two large auto-makers to bring the assembly of minibus taxis to South Africa, resulting in more than 83 000 taxis produced locally by the end of March 2019. Minister Patel has advocated policy measures to promote deeper localisation which has impacted positively in a number of sectors, including food processing and clothing, footwear and home textile production.

In Parliament, he secured the approval of two major laws.

The Competition Amendment Act, 2018 broke new ground on competition policy, with a focus on addressing economic concentration and abuse of dominance, including stronger statutory provisions on price discrimination, predatory pricing, excessive prices and abuse of buyer power (monopsony).

The Infrastructure Development Act, 2014 provided a statutory framework for the integration of economic and social infrastructure in the country.

He has represented South Africa in BRICS (Brazil, Russia, India, China and South Africa) Summits and at the World Economic Forum in Davos.

Patel was maintained as Minister of Economic Development in the first Cabinet of President Cyril Ramaphosa between February 2018 and May 2019, before being appointed to the expanded portfolio of Trade, Industry and Competition in May 2019.

Minister of Trade, Industry and Competition (2019 to Present) 

On 29 May 2019, President Ramaphosa appointed Patel as Minister of Trade, Industry and Competition, bringing together the former ministries of Economic Development and Trade and Industry under one portfolio.

As Minister of Trade, Industry and Competition, Patel championed the development of President Ramaphosa's re-imagined industrial strategy for the 6th Administration of South Africa's democratic era. The strategy seeks to bring together a number of industrial policy levers to drive greater levels of industrialisation. These levers include building more dynamic and competitive industries through the implementation of sector masterplans in key parts of the economy; opening new export markets through the development and implementation of key agreements like the African Continental Free Trade Area; investment promotion through improved ease of doing business; transformation of key sectors of the economy through the use of competition policy and support for historically disadvantaged South Africans; and redress of spatial inequality through the development of special economic zones and industrial parks.

During his time as Minister of Trade, Industry and Competition, Patel has secured a landmark agreement with the clothing, textile, footwear and leather value-chain, which will increase the level of locally manufactured apparel and footwear sold in South African retail stores; an agreement with the poultry industry to bolster local poultry production;  and an agreement with PepsiCo, which amongst other commitments will establish a worker empowerment trust as part of its acquisition of Pioneer Foods, which will ultimately provide workers in the company a 13% beneficial interest in the local business and board representation. Under his stewardship, R364 billion was committed for investment in the South African economy at the 2nd South African Investment Conference, bringing the total value of commitments at the first two conferences to R664 billion against the President's target of R1.2 trillion (US$100 billion).

On 28 December 2021, Patel tested positive for COVID-19. This diagnosis came two weeks after Cyril Ramaphosa tested positive. It is the second time Patel contracted the disease. He had previously tested positive on 25 July 2020.

Other relevant positions

He was nominated by President Mandela to serve on the Financial and Fiscal Commission (FFC) during its first term. He has served on a number of other public bodies, including the Council for Higher Education (CHE), the Council of the University of Cape Town (UCT), the governing Board of the Commission for Conciliation Mediation and Arbitration (CCMA) and the board of Proudly SA. He was a labour representative on the Presidential Working Group and on the business-labour Millennium Labour Council (MLC). He has been an executive council member of Nedlac since its formation in 1995. He also served on a joint committee of the Judicial Services Commission and Nedlac to interview applicants for posts to the Labour Court and Labour Appeal Court.

Books

He has edited two books: one on the National Economic Forum and the other on workers' rights in the new South Africa.

Awards

He was awarded a special medal by UCT in 2008 at the June graduation ceremony, in recognition of his public service.

He received the Global Leaders of Tomorrow award from the Davos-based Global Economic Forum in 1994.

He was named as one of the 500 most influential Muslims in the world today in a major public report compiled by Georgetown University and the Royal Islamic Strategic Studies Centre, Jordan.

References

External links

Statement by President Jacob Zuma on the appointment of the new Cabinet
Interview with Mr. Ebrahim Patel

1962 births
Living people
Members of the National Assembly of South Africa
Government ministers of South Africa
South African politicians of Indian descent
South African Muslims
South African people of Gujarati descent
People from Cape Town
Politicians from Cape Town
People from the Western Cape
Politicians from the Western Cape
University of Cape Town alumni